Mood lighting is igniting or illumination, designed to create a temporary state of mind or feeling.

Effects of lighting on humans 

Field studies have shown in office settings that blue-enriched lighting over the course of several weeks can lead to improved alertness, performance, and sleep quality in comparison to lighting with a lower color temperature.

Effects of indoor lighting  

Indoor lighting can have a variety of effects on human subjects living within an artificial indoor environment. A study with ninety-six subjects, ages ranging from 18 to 55, were examined on how a variety of lighting could impact their mood and cognition. Subjects showed higher problem-solving abilities for females in a warm vs. cool white light source. The opposite result was shown for the male subjects.

Types of mood lighting 

Mood lighting can come in several variations ranging from ambient, natural, or artificial lighting.

References

Further reading
 Kuijsters, Andre, et al. “Lighting to Make You Feel Better: Improving the Mood of Elderly People with Affective Ambiences.” PLoS ONE, vol. 10, no. 7, 2015, doi:10.1371/journal.pone.0132732.
 Ohio State University. (2013, August 6). What color is your night light? It may affect your mood. ScienceDaily. Retrieved October 8, 2017 from www.sciencedaily.com/releases/2013/08/130806203150.htm
 Shin, Yu-Bin, et al. “The effect on emotions and brain activity by the direct/Indirect lighting in the residential environment.” Neuroscience Letters, vol. 584, 1 Jan. 2015, pp. 28–32., doi:10.1016/j.neulet.2014.09.046.

Lighting